The Bovill Opera House in Bovill, Latah County, Idaho, is an opera house believed to have been built in the first decade of the 20th century. It is currently listed on the National Register of Historic Places.

According to the National Park Service:
Believed to have been built in the first decade of the 20th century, the Bovill Opera House served for five decades as the entertainment and social center for the town of Bovill and its surrounding communities. Although used primarily as a "moving picture hall", the Bovill Opera House hosted dances, performances, as well as public hearings and gatherings. In the 1930s the upstairs was transformed into a miniature golf course and later used as a roller skating-rink. While there is a metal sign reading "Bovill Historical Museum" it was apparently never used as a museum on a consistent basis.

The building was listed on the U.S. National Register of Historic Places on January 27, 2010. The listing was announced as the featured listing in the National Park Service's weekly list of February 5, 2010.

See also
 National Register of Historic Places listings in Latah County, Idaho

References

External links
 

1900s establishments in Idaho
Buildings and structures completed in the 1900s
Buildings and structures in Latah County, Idaho
Cinemas and movie theaters in Idaho
Theatres on the National Register of Historic Places in Idaho
National Register of Historic Places in Latah County, Idaho
Event venues on the National Register of Historic Places in Idaho
Music venues in Idaho